Carlos Antonio Banda Campos (born 23 August 1977) is a Swedish former professional footballer who played as a defender. He started his career in IFK Österåker. He joined Djurgårdens IF in 1996 and made three Allsvenskan appearances for them. He then spent five years at Jönköpings Södra IF. He also played for Syrianska FC and Gröndals IK.

Honours
Djurgårdens IF
 Division 1 Norra: 1998

References

1977 births
Living people
Association football defenders
Swedish footballers
Sportspeople of Chilean descent
Allsvenskan players
Ettan Fotboll players
Djurgårdens IF Fotboll players
Jönköpings Södra IF players
Syrianska FC players
Gröndals IK players